Mamonas Assassinas was a Brazilian satirical rock band. Their musical style employed a humorous mixture between rock and a wide range of styles, often borrowing elements from other music, among which were the main riff of the Portuguese Vira ("Vira-Vira"), Northeastern Brazilian rhythms like forró ("Jumento Celestino"), Mexican music ("Pelados em Santos"), heavy metal ("Débil Metal"), sertanejo ("Bois Don't Cry"), and even pagode ("Lá Vem o Alemão").

The band's name carries a double-entendre as, in Portuguese, mamonas can be either the name of the Castor oil plant, which contains the highly toxic compound ricin (their logo incorporated a castor bean) or the augmentative for mamas, meaning breasts (which were prominently pictured on the album cover). The band mentioned model Mari Alexandre as an influence to the name, and even translated the name into English as "Killer Big Breasts".

On March 2, 1996, the plane in which the band was traveling crashed into the Cantareira mountain range, near São Paulo, killing all five band members. Their short lived and "meteoric" success were celebrated for decades and the members are remembered and celebrated even to the present day in Brazil.

History

Early years and major era 
The band started its activities in 1989 as a trio, without Dinho and Júlio, in a band called Utopia, performing covers of Legião Urbana and Rush. Soon Dinho and Júlio were incorporated, and Utopia performed in the suburbs of São Paulo. They even did release an album, but it sold less than 100 copies. Just as the band noticed the comedical intromissions and songs on their concerts were better accepted than the serious performances, the band decided to fully embrace the comedy on their music, including a change to a double entendre name. Their first demo reached Rafael, son of the artistic director of EMI-Odeon, João Augusto Soares. João Augusto hired the band afterwards.

The plane crash 
The band's successful career came to an end along with all band members' lives on March 2, 1996, due to a plane crash. After a show in Brasília, the band was flying to São Paulo-Guarulhos International Airport, in Guarulhos. They  were going home to spend a day off with their families since the next day they would travel to Portugal to start a new tour. The plane crashed at Serra da Cantareira, 20 miles away from the airport at 23:00.
Along with the band members, four other people died in the crash:
- Jorge Germano, the pilot;
- Alberto Takeda, the co-pilot;
- Isac Souto, a roadie and Dinho's cousin; and
- Sérgio Saturnino, their body guard.

Band member Júlio Rasec told his hairdresser (who made a video in his salon of it) he'd had a nightmare the previous evening about a plane crashing and that he did not know what that meant. Júlio seemed deeply disturbed about it and it is reported that he was upset and introverted during the whole day. His hairdresser told Julio he'd pray for them. The video was aired multiple times on TV and it was the subject of several TV shows and documentaries.

The death of all members of the band created a great commotion in Brazil, which was still mourning Ayrton Senna's death two years before, and because at the time they were the most famous band in the country. Their short-lived fame and devastating death are strongly remembered in Brazil today, and their songs are celebrated and influential to the Brazilian music industry.

The aircraft was a Learjet 25 that was having multiple radar problems even prior to takeoff. On final approach to land on runway 09R, the pilot decided to abort the attempt and went-around. As it flew around the runway for a second attempt to land, it crashed into the side of a heavily forested mountain in the Cantareira range, at 23:16 (Brazil Standard Time, UTC-3:00).

Videography 
 1996: MTV na Estrada (MTV on the Road) (re-released in DVD in 2004) 
 2002: Show Ao Vivo em Valinhos 1996 (Live in Valinhos)
 2008: Por Toda Minha Vida - Mamonas Assassinas (Exhibited in TV Globo)
 2011: Mamonas para sempre (Documentary)

Members 

 Alecsander Alves (known as Dinho) - vocals March 5, 1971 - March 2, 1996.
Dinho was born in Irecê, Bahia but moved with his parents to Guarulhos when he was only two months old. He dropped out of high school and started working as a canvasser. He was known to be a very fun and charismatic person and met Bento, Samuel and Sérgio in their concert when he volunteered to sing Sweet Child o' Mine, since none of the members knew how to sing the song. The performance was so funny and strong that the trio asked him to be the lead singer. Júlio, who was his friend since they were kids entered the band not long after.
 Alberto Hinoto (Bento Hinoto) - guitar August 7, 1970 - March 2, 1996
Bento was born in Itaquaquecetuba in a Japanese Brazilian family of seven children. His brother, Maurício gave him a guitar when he was 14 and also taught him how to play it. Bento started to play by himself and he was known to be the best musician of the band and a more quiet yet fun person. 
His brother and Sérgio used to work together and he introduced them, after that they started playing together and soon Samuel started to play the bass as well, together they formed the trio Utopia, after, Dinho and Julio entered the band and they formed Mamonas Assassinas.
 Samuel Reis de Oliveira (Samuel Reoli; "Reoli" is a contraction of the last names Reis and Oliveira) - bass guitar March 11, 1973 - March 2, 1996
Samuel was born in Guarulhos and he was the younger brother of Sérgio. He was the youngest of the band and is known to be really naive, authentic and an airplane lover. At first he was not interested in music, he preferred to draw airplanes but after Bento and Sergio started to play together, Samuel got involved and decided to play the bass. 
 Júlio César Barbosa (Júlio Rasec; Rasec is "César" spelled backwards) - keyboards, backing vocals January 4, 1968 - March 2, 1996
Júlio was born in Guarulhos and is known to be really calm, patient and the most caring person of the band. He was not known to be a good musician but was the link of positivity of the band who would calm the others and bring joy to everyone. 
Júlio and Dinho were friends since they were children and Dinho was the one who brought Júlio to the band, after that, the band was complete. Júlio was a good composer and would sing songs live such as Sábado de Sol and Sabão Crá-Crá.
Júlio dreamed about a plane crash a day prior to the accident. His hairdresser recorded a video in the same day of the accident where Júlio says "I don't know, I dreamed that the plane was falling/crashing. I don't what that means" while saying this, he was scratching his head which his father said he would do when he was worried about something.
 Sérgio Reis de Oliveira (Sérgio Reoli; Samuel's older brother) - drums September 30, 1969 - March 2, 1996
Sérgio was born in Guarulhos and he worked with Bento's brother who introduced them to play together. Soon after, his brother Samuel started to play the bass and the formed the trio Utopia. Dinho and Júlio entered the band not long after and together they formed Mamonas Assassinas. 
Sérgio was known to be grumpy and a person who complained a lot, on the other hand he used to make a lot of jokes and to be really funny as well.

Discography

Studio albums

Compilation albums

Live albums

Singles

References

External links 
Cometa Mamonas - Unofficial website, currently out of service.
Band's profile at CliqueMusic 

Brazilian musical groups
Musical groups established in 1995
Musical groups disestablished in 1996
Comedy rock musical groups
1995 establishments in Brazil
1996 disestablishments in Brazil
Obscenity controversies in music
Victims of aviation accidents or incidents in Brazil
Victims of aviation accidents or incidents in 1996